Philenora omophanes, the delicate philenora, is a moth in the subfamily Arctiinae. It was described by Edward Meyrick in 1886. It is found in the Australian states of New South Wales and Victoria.

References

Moths described in 1886
Lithosiini